The Ak Chin Indian Community of the Maricopa (Ak-Chin) Indian Reservation (O'odham language: ʼAkĭ Ciñ O'odham) is a federally recognized tribe and Native American community located in the Santa Cruz Valley in Pinal County, Arizona, 37 miles south of Phoenix and near the City of Maricopa. The Community is composed mainly of Akimel Oʼodham and Tohono Oʼodham, as well as some ethnic Hia-Ced Oʼodham members. According to the 2020 United States Census, the reservation has 1,070 residents. The Community comprises over 1,100 members that live on and off the reservation.

The Maricopa Reservation was established by the federal government in 1912, under President William Howard Taft; within a few months his administration reduced it by more than half, due to opposition from non-Native farmers in the area. Gaining federal recognition in 1961, the tribe has established a large agricultural operation, aided by gaining water rights to the Colorado River in a 1984 federal settlement. This settlement enabled it to continue using irrigation to support its agriculture and other needs.

The Community opened a gaming casino in 1994, Harrah's Ak-Chin Casino, with related hotel facilities. In 2011 the casino and resort was the major contributor to the economy of Pinal County. In July 2011, the casino underwent a $20 million expansion, with addition of a new 152-room hotel tower that doubled its capacity. The resort now has 300 rooms, and an outdoor swimming pool, completed in 2012.

In 2006, the Ak-Chin Indian Community purchased the Phoenix Regional Airport, which was later renamed Ak-Chin Regional Airport. Located near the Santa Cruz Commerce Center, the 170-acre Ak-Chin Regional Airport consists of an airport building with a 5,000 ft. runway.

On July 1, 2010, the Ak-Chin Indian Community purchased the Royal Dunes golf course and renamed it as the Ak-Chin Southern Dunes Golf Club.

Reservation
The reservation is located in Pinal County within the Sonoran Desert, about 40 miles south of Phoenix and next to Maricopa.

Government
The Ak-Chin Indian Community is headquartered in Maricopa, Arizona. In the mid-20th century it reorganized, creating a written constitution, by-laws, and elected government, gaining federal recognition in 1961.

Prior to 2017, Tribal Council Members served three-year terms, and were elected annually on a staggered basis. The Council elected a chairman and vice-chairman. Beginning with 2017 (election in Nov. 2016), the chairman and Vice Chairman were elected at-large to serve four-year terms. The three Council Members will serve two-year terms. The November 2016 election was historic because it was the first time that Community members were able to vote directly for chairman and Vice Chairman. A change to the constitution was adopted in July 2016 allowing for candidates to run for a specific office and for Community members to vote specifically for the chairman and Vice Chairman in addition to Council Members.

As of 2022, the tribal council members and presiding officers are the following:
 Council Member: Robert Miguel, Chairman
 Council Member: Lemuel Vincent, Vice Chairman
 Council Member: Delia M. Carlyle
 Council Member: Lisa Garcia
 Council Member: Octavio Machado

Demographics

Most of the population lives in Ak-Chin Village, in the western part of the reservation. Part of the city of Maricopa also lies within reservation territory. In total, the area (including Community and non-Community members) comprises 1,070 as of the 2020 United States Census. The 2020 U.S. Census also reports that 87.5% (914 individuals) of the total 1,070 population comprises American Indian or Native Alaskans. This is an increase of 742 from 2000.  Of those individuals, 90.2% were born on the reservation and/or in Arizona. Additionally, 16.3% identify as Hispanic or Latino, 6.2% two or more races, 1.5% White, and 0.3% African American or Black. Of the total population, 47.8% are male and 52.2% are female. The majority of the population are ages 25 to 44 (29%) or 5 to 17 years of age (23.5%), with 7.9% ages 65 and older. The average median age is 27.9 years old.

Of the total population, 37.4% live below the federal poverty line. The 2020 American Community Survey reports that 33.7% of the working population is employed in the service industry, specifically public administration, education, health care, social services, and arts and recreation. Regarding housing, 94.5% of the total population are renters.

Language

The Ak-Chin Indian Community has its own written form of the Oʼodham language. It is in the Piman group of the Uto-Aztecan language family. The name Ak-Chin is an Oʼodham word that means the "mouth of the arroyo."

Economy
Ak-Chin Farms Enterprises is the Community's agricultural business. It controls 15,000 acres, making it one of the largest agricultural communities in the country. It has long used irrigation to support this enterprise. In 1984 the tribe gained a federal settlement for water rights, being entitled to 75,000 acre-feet of Colorado River water. The farms raise mostly cotton, barley, wheat and milo.

The tribe also owns and operates Harrah's Ak-Chin Casino, which opened in 1994, and related resort facilities: Agave's Southwestern Restaurant, Copper Cactus Grill, Harvest Buffet, the Range restaurant, and hotel, all located in Maricopa. The tribe owns the naming rights for the Ak-Chin Pavilion, a venue in Phoenix designed for various entertainment acts. The casino and resort draw customers from Maricopa and nearby county population, as well as from the large Phoenix metropolitan area.

According to a study conducted in 2011, "Harrah's Ak-Chin Casino Resort is the largest contributor to the Pinal County economy, accounting for nearly 1,100 jobs and generating more than $205.3 million in economic activity in 2010." Expansion of the resort by addition of a large hotel tower has generated higher revenues since then.

Revenues from the casino and resort have enabled the tribe to invest in other development. In 2006 it purchased the 450-acre former Phoenix Regional Airport property, renamed in 2012 as Ak-Chin Regional Airport. It is being improved. Nearby the tribe acquired the 50-acre Santa Cruz Commerce Center industrial park, which is being developed under leases. The tribe has set up the Ak-Chin Industrial Park Board to make leases and monitor development there. The tribe applied to the BIA to have both properties taken into trust on its behalf. It continues to work with local communities on development nearby.

In 2010 the tribe purchased the Southern Dunes Golf Club, which is open to the public for fees. The tribe makes it available as an amenity to guests at Harrah's Ak-Chin Casino Resort.

In November 2012, the tribe opened the $50 million, 165,000-square foot Ak-Chin entertainment complex, with a multi-theater cinema, bowling alley, restaurants, arcade and areas for staging events. It is located at the edge of the reservation next to the city of Maricopa. Mayor Christian Price said he thought the project would be "a great addition to the area" and that the city and tribe could encourage other development in the area.

From its strong gaming and resort revenues, the tribe has made several improvements within the reservation, including the construction of a new fire station, water reclamation facility, and surface water treatment plant.

Notes

External links
 Ak-Chin Indian Community, official website
 Inter Tribal Council of Arizona: Ak-Chin Indian Community
  – listing 97 burials
 

Ak-Chin Indian Community
Federally recognized tribes in the United States
Geography of Pinal County, Arizona
Native American tribes in Arizona
Tohono O'odham
1912 establishments in Arizona